Jean-Pierre Koepp (26 April 1934 in Holzthum - 3 August 2010 in Ettelbruck) was a politician and restaurateur in Luxembourg. He was a representative of the Alternative Democratic Reform Party (ADR), having been one of the ADR's founder-members and one of their first members of the Chamber of Deputies, in which he has sat between 1989 and 2009.

Koepp was elected to the Chamber to represent the Nord constituency at the 1989 legislative election, with the ADR, then a single-issue pensioners' party called the 'Action Committee 5/6ths Pensions for Everyone', scoring a remarkable electoral upset in securing four seats in the Chamber. He was re-elected in 1994, when the ADR increased their representation in the Chamber to five seats.

In the 1999 legislative elections, he placed first on the ADR list, with two being elected, and came third amongst all candidates (behind only ministers-to-be Charles Goerens and Marie-Josée Jacobs). In 2004, Koepp came first amongst ADR candidates again, albeit with a greatly reduced vote count.  Nonetheless, the ADR still won enough votes for one deputy to be returned, allowing Koepp to be re-elected.  He did not run in the most recent election, leaving the top place on the list to Jean Colombera.

He died in 2010, at the age of 76.

Footnotes

External links
 Chamber of Deputies official website biography

Members of the Chamber of Deputies (Luxembourg)
Alternative Democratic Reform Party politicians
Members of the Chamber of Deputies (Luxembourg) from Nord
Luxembourgian businesspeople
1934 births
2010 deaths
Consthum
Restaurateurs